Krastyu Sergeyev Trichkov (born 12 April 1923) was a Bulgarian politician from the Bulgarian Communist Party. He served as the first first deputy chairman of the State Council.

Biography

Trichkov was born in Belitsa, Razlog on 12 April 1923. He was the brother of the officer of the State Security Service Ivan Trichkov. From 1940 he was a member of the Workers' Youth League, and since 1942 – the PA. Participant in the resistance movement during the Second World War (1942–1944). From 1942 he was political commissar of the Razlog read. After the coup d'état, he was secretary of the provincial committee of the YCL in Blagoevgrad and First Secretary of the Regional Committee of the Communist Party in Blagoevgrad from 1957 to 1971.

From 1958 to 1962, he was a candidate member, and from 1962 on a full member, of the Central Committee of the Communist Party, where he remained until 1990. From 1966 to 1981 he was a candidate member of the Politburo of the Central Committee of the Communist Party. Between 1971 and 1976 he was first deputy chairman of the State Council, Deputy Prime Minister, Chairman of the Committee on State and People's Control (1976 to 1981). From 1981 to 1988, he was first vice-president of the National Council of the Fatherland Front. In the period 1981–1986 he was a member of the State Council. In 1990 he retired. He was the author of two volumes of memoirs.

References

1923 births
Possibly living people
20th-century Bulgarian politicians
Bulgarian Agrarian National Union politicians
Bulgarian anti-fascists
Bulgarian atheists
Bulgarian Communist Party politicians
Bulgarian communists
Government ministers of Bulgaria
Members of the National Assembly (Bulgaria)
People from Blagoevgrad Province
Bulgarian resistance members